Svetlana Alexandrovna Kotochigova is a Soviet and American physicist whose research involves the theory and simulation of ultracold atoms and ultracold molecules. She is a research professor of physics at Temple University and a researcher at the National Institute of Standards and Technology and Smithsonian Astrophysical Observatory.

Education and career
Kotochigova earned a doctorate at Saint Petersburg State University in 1981, and worked as a researcher at the Vavilov State Optical Institute from 1981 to 1991. After short-term positions in Greece and France, she came to the US as a guest researcher at the National Institute of Standards and Technology (NIST) in 1994, and continued at NIST as a research associate beginning in 1997.

In 2004, she added affiliations as a research professor at Temple University and as a research associate at the Smithsonian Astrophysical Observatory.

Recognition
Kotochigova was elected as a Fellow of the American Physical Society (APS) in 2011, after a nomination from the APS Division of Atomic, Molecular and Optical Physics, "for insightful theoretical description of the formation and control of ultracold molecules in optical trapping potentials".

References

External links

Year of birth missing (living people)
Living people
Soviet physicists
Soviet women physicists
American physicists
American women physicists
Saint Petersburg State University alumni
Temple University faculty